Smila is a city located on Dnieper Upland near the Tyasmyn River, in Cherkasy Raion, Cherkasy Oblast of Ukraine. It hosts the administration of Smila urban hromada, one of the hromadas of Ukraine.  The Tyasmyn River, a Dnieper tributary, flows through the city. Population:

Climate 
Climate in Smila is moderate continental. Winters are cold with frequent snow. Summers are warm and can be hot in July, with little rain. Periods of temperatures higher than +10 last up to 170 days. Average annual precipitation is 450–520 mm.

History

Early history and founding 
Smila and its environs have been settled since the Stone Age. Archeologists  discovered ruins of ancient settlements and numerous mounds in and around Smila. Two large ancient settlements and 44 mounds were first investigated during 1879–1883 by O. O. Bobrynsky, grandson of Smila nobleman Count Olexiy Olexiyovich Bobrynsky. The relics date partly to the Stone Age and partly to the Bronze Age.

The official foundation date of Smila is 1542.  Documents from the Grand Duchy of Lithuania indicate that the settlement Yatzkove-Tyasmyno was founded at a hamlet in 1542. The modern name of the city has been known since the first half of the 17th century.

The city's name is connected with a local legend first recorded by Count L. O. Bobrynsky: "An unknown girl led warriors through a heavy swamp showing a route to the enemy. The battle was very bloody. They killed a lot of enemies there but they couldn’t save the brave girl. They buried her near Tyasmyn and called her Smila. Then warriors honoured her in the city’s name."

Polish-Lithuanian Commonwealth (1569–1793) 
After the Union of Lublin in July 1569, Smila was a settlement of the Polish–Lithuanian Commonwealth.  From 1648 until 1667 the squadron town was part of the Chyhyryn Regiment. In 1654 the Russian tsar gave Pereyaslav colonel Pavlo Teteria possession of the town. During 1658-1659 Danylo Vyhovsky succeeded Teterya as the owner.

The Chudniv treaty of 1660 renewed Polish jurisdiction over this land. Smila became the property of Stanislav Koniecpolski as part of the Polish–Lithuanian Commonwealth. Constant wars between Ukrainian Cossacks, Polish owners, Tatars, Turks, Russians and Swedes, part of a period of strife in the wider region called The Ruin, led to the demolition of Smila. 

The town's next owners, the princes Lubomirski, built a wooden castle with an arbor and a palisade around the entire city in 1742.

During 1730s-1760s, some of Smila's residents took part in the Haidamaka movement. In 1787 prince Xaveriy Lubomirski sold lands around Smila to the Russian prince Potyomkin. Six years later Smila became a property of Potyomkin's nephew, Count Alexander Samoylov. Two years the later population of Smila was 1747 people with 50 crafters, nine shoemakers, six weavers, and eight tailors.  Others were peasants.

Russian Empire (1793–1917) 

In 1787, Smila became the property of Prince Potemkin, a Russian military leader. After Potemkin's death,  Count Alexander Samoilov inherited the estate.

Since 1793, Right-Bank Ukraine had been part of the Russian state. At this time, Smila became a county town, but a year later the institutions were transferred to Cherkasy. Since January 1797, Smila has been a town in Cherkassy district.  After the second Partition of Poland, Smila became a township subordinated to Cherkassy county of the Kyiv Governorate of the Russian Empire. 

In 1838 Smila became the property of Countess Sofia Alexandrovna Bobrinskaya (nee Samoilova). In the same year, Count Alexey Alekseevich Bobrinsky (a descendant of Catherine II and Count Grigory Orlov) began building  a large sugar refining plant, one of the first in the south of Ukraine. To development the city, he needed more people. Alexey Bobrinsky in 1840 gathered peasants from the Kharkiv, Oryol, and Smolensk provinces in Smila.

Smila's becoming a possession of the Bobrynsky counts was an important juncture in Smila's development, because the town served not only its inhabitants, but also the entire Cherkasy district" (L. Pohylevich). Although the order in the city and its improvement were legally taken care of by the city administration, in fact, the development of Smila took place at the expense of Bobrynsky.

1917–1921 

Historical upheavals of the 20th century, revolutions and world wars, did not bypass the city. The events of the February Revolution of 1917 in Petrograd and the abdication of the throne by Emperor Nicholas II reached Smila.

In early March, soldiers of the Smila garrison elected the Council of Soldiers' Deputies. Soon, councils of workers' deputies were created at the Bobrinskaya station, sugar factories and in some landlord savings. On April 17, 1917, a Civic Committee was created in the city, headed by a representative of the Ukrainian Social Democrats. The police were replaced by elected police. In early April, a single Council of Workers' Deputies was formed. The majority in it were Mensheviks and Social Revolutionaries.

At the same time, various public committees arose in the city of Smila, demanding an end to the war, a reduction in working hours, and peasant ownership of land. In 1917-1920 years, on the territory of Smila, in the wake of the national uprising, the power of the UPR, the Hetmanate and the Directory were established, the first detachments of the Free Cossacks were formed. In January — March 1918 Smila free Cossacks under the leadership of Yakiv Vodyanoy took part in battles against the Russian army returning from the Western Front to Russia. 

Especially successful operation of the Free Cossacks, in particular, smila, was against the 8th Russian army in the area of art. Bobrinskaya. With the coming to power of the hetman P. Skoropadsky to Smila in early March 1918 arrived units of the Austro-German troops. The peasants were ordered to return land, equipment and livestock to the landowners. In response, a partisan movement of detachments of various political directions is unfolding. On November 18, 1918, railway workers on the station. Bobrynska disarmed the State Guard and the German military unit. After that, the German troops were withdrawn from the city and county, and power passed to the revolutionary committee. 

Soviet power established itself in 1920 year. And only at the end of the civil war, the townspeople began to rebuild the destroyed urban economy.

1921–1939 

In 1932-1933, Smila, like all of Ukraine, experienced brutal famine.  Later, two waves of political repression swept through the city, which claimed thousands of lives.  The city recovered, and by the beginning of World War II, Smila was a developed city of regional importance with a population of about 35,000. There were 14 industrial enterprises and 11 artels of industrial cooperation, two hospitals, ten secondary schools, a mechanical and technological technical school, and two schools for factory training.

World War II 
By the beginning of 1941, enemy troops captured Smila. In just the first days of the occupation, the invaders shot more than 400 inhabitants, and thousands of people died at the Taras Shevchenko station in the open air from hunger, cold and epidemics. Underground organizations and groups were created: "Partisan detachment them. Pozharsky", "For the Fatherland", etc.

For 912 days, Smila region was held by the Germans, but the Smilas withstood, won and on January 29, 1944, the Victory Banner was hoisted over the city. In the battles for the liberation of our region, 1351 people died, more than 12 thousand smilas rest in eternal sleep in mass graves

Cold War  

After the war, the industrial and economic revival of the city began.

The production capacities of enterprises are being reconstructed and increased, and new ones are opened: in 1958 – the furniture factory, in 1960 – the Metalist plant, in 1964 – the citric acid plant.

1951 – the south station of the station was opened. Them. T. Shevchenko, and in 1964 through the station. T. Shevchenko began to run electric trains

1972 – The construction of a radio equipment plant begins.

1973 – Natural gas is produced.

1980–1990 — Multi-storey residential neighborhoods No. 13,49,53 were built up.

A new overpass was opened through the railway track Znamenka-Mironovka.

The Lower Park was created

Post-1991 
1996 – the research and production private enterprise "DAK-Elektroprom" opened

2009 – “Azhur” factory for the production of ice cream opened

2012 – the city park and fountain were reconstructed

2016 - major repairs to the façade of the city’s House of Culture.

2016 – a diagnostic room of computed tomography with modern tomographic equipment opened at the city hospital.

In September 2019, Smila celebrated the 622nd anniversary of the founding of the city

Until 18 July 2020, Smila was designated as a city of oblast significance and served as the administrative center of Smila Raion though it did not belong to the raion. Settlements of Ploske and Irdynivka were subordinated to Smila city council. As part of the administrative reform of Ukraine, which reduced the number of raions of Cherkasy Oblast to four, the city was merged into Cherkasy Raion.
One consequence for Smila of the Russian invasion of Ukraine is that air strikes started a large fire near the Tyasmyn River in October, 2022.

Economy
The economic emphasis is on mechanical engineering, and the food industry is also important.

Smila is the transport hub for the surrounding region.  Smila is where the Kyiv–Dnipro and Odessa–Russia rail routes cross, making Smila one of the most important railway junctions in Ukraine. The large station at the junction is named after Ukraine's national poet and artist, Taras Shevchenko.

Gallery

International relations
Sister cities:
  Newton, Iowa, United states
  Vatutine, Ukraine
  Irpin, Ukraine
 Rzhev, Russia

Population

References

  (1972) Історія міст і сіл Української CCP - Черкаська область (History of Towns and Villages of the Ukrainian SSR - Cherkasy Oblast), Kyiv.
Famous Holodomor Genocide movie Bitter Harvest 2017 seen globally shot in Kyiv Perihova Ethnic outdoor museum and Kyiv center locations .Richard Bachynsky Hoover Bitter Harvest film screenwriter executive producers son Yevhen Nianchenko was born in Smila in 2008 where the Canadian half Ukrainian film writer actor producer raised him his first year with his mother Alona to be with her loving  family and they later moved to Bucha Ukraine but always visited their Smila family several times a year and still do today . The screenwriter  depicted Smila suburb country side as the central family  Kachanuik  Holodny Yar Kozak family as the story line sunflower wheat farming village during 1932/33 under strict terrorizing measures under Stalins Soviet regime when seven million Ukrainians  died of forced starvation and hundreds helpless in the cold winter during the 1932/33 Holodomor Genocide of Ukraine in fields at their home and hundreds more at Smilas Taras Shevchenko Train station begging and dying there in search for bits of any food. Bitter Harvest Cast stars Max Irons, Terence Stamp ,Barry Pepper ,Samantha Barks, Tamer Hasan.Bitter Harvest 2017. see Wikipedia or IMDB trailers Youtube.

External links
  Official city website
  Unofficial city website

Cities in Cherkasy Oblast
Cherkassky Uyezd
Shtetls
Cities of regional significance in Ukraine